Rudauli is a constituency of the Uttar Pradesh Legislative Assembly covering the city of Rudauli in the Faizabad district of Uttar Pradesh, India.

Rudauli is one of five assembly constituencies in the Faizabad Lok Sabha constituency. Since 2008, this assembly constituency is numbered 271 amongst 403 constituencies.

Election results

2022

2022
Bharatiya Janta Party candidate Ram Chandra Yadav won in 2022 Uttar Pradesh Legislative Elections defeating Samajwadi Party candidate Anand Sen Yadav by a margin of 40616 votes.

References

External links
 

Assembly constituencies of Uttar Pradesh
Faizabad district